Josef Hassid (28 December 19237 November 1950) was a Polish violinist.

Childhood
Born on 28 December 1923 to Jewish parents in Suwałki, Poland, as Joseph or Józef Chasyd, he was the second youngest of four children. He lost his mother when he was ten and was brought up by his father, Owsiej, who took charge of his career. After lessons with a local violin teacher, he studied at the Chopin School of Music in Warsaw under Mieczysław Michałowicz (born 1872) and Irena Dubiska (1899–1989) starting in 1934. In 1935 he entered the first Henryk Wieniawski International Violin Competition in Warsaw, but suffered a memory lapse; he received an honorary diploma.

His father arranged for him to play for fellow Pole Bronisław Huberman, who was much impressed and he arranged for Hassid to study under the Hungarian virtuoso Carl Flesch at his summer course in 1937 at Spa, Belgium, where fellow students included Ivry Gitlis, Ginette Neveu and Ida Haendel.

London studies and concerts
Hassid came to London with his father in 1938 at Flesch's invitation, to continue studies with him. Flesch concentrated on his musical and interpretative development rather than technical skills. Musical celebrities who heard him play at Flesch's house and were astonished at his ability included Joseph Szigeti, Jacques Thibaud, David Oistrakh and Fritz Kreisler. In a passage supplementing his father's memoirs Carl F. Flesch wrote that "Hassid was no doubt one of the strongest violin talents of his time. Indeed Fritz Kreisler, after hearing him at my father's house, said: 'A fiddler like Heifetz is born every 100 years; one like Hassid every 200 years.'"  For the remainder of Hassid’s career, Kreisler lent him a violin from 1860 by the French maker Jean-Baptiste Vuillaume, which was a great improvement over the instrument he had played up until then.

He gave a private recital with the pianist Ivor Newton on 9 March 1938 as "Yossef Hassid" at the home of Mr L.L. Gildesgame, 41 Clifton Hill, South Hampstead, where the guests included Sir Henry Wood. After giving a private recital at the home of Sir Philip Sassoon, Hassid made his public debut at a recital with Gerald Moore in the Wigmore Hall on 3 April 1940, billed as the "Polish Boy Violinist", playing works by Corelli (La Follia variations), Debussy, Schubert (Sonata in G), Bach (adagio and fugue from one of the unaccompanied sonatas), Paganini (I palpiti) and others. The next day The Times wrote Hassid "showed imagination and musical insight" and that "his performance created a strong impression." Many years later Moore commented that Hassid was "the greatest instrumental genius I've ever partnered. I don't know how to explain his incandescence. He had technical perfection, marvellous intonation, glorious tone – but there was something above that which was quite incredible, a metaphysical quality. Sadly he had an unhappy love affair which literally drove him mad. But then maybe the unrest inside him made him play so fantastically." (Interview in The Gramophone, April 1973.)

Three weeks later, on the evening of 25 April, he made his orchestral debut at the Queen's Hall in a Polish Relief Fund concert (broadcast on the BBC Home Service) playing the Tchaikovsky Violin Concerto with the LPO under Grzegorz Fitelberg (during which he suffered a memory lapse). The concerto was preceded by two short items by Chabrier and Kondracki and followed by Beethoven's Seventh Symphony. The next day The Times reported that Hassid "showed some signs of nervousness at the outset", but "the beauty of his tone was striking and the brilliance of the finale" earned him generous applause. On 9 June 1940 he was due to appear with Eileen Joyce as a supporting artist for Richard Tauber in a concert at the Colston Hall, Bristol, but was replaced in the event by the cellist Eleanor Warren.

He gave a few recital broadcasts on the BBC and played the Beethoven Violin Concerto during an afternoon concert in the Queen's Hall with Sir Adrian Boult conducting the London Philharmonic Orchestra on 5 January 1941. Three days later The Times commented of Hassid's as "a technically accomplished performance, but he has not yet attained to the purity of style, especially in the matter of sustaining an even tone throughout a phrase that the music needs."

Hassid's final concert was also at the Queen's Hall, on the afternoon of 1 March 1941, where he played the Brahms Violin Concerto with the Sidney Beer Symphony Orchestra of about thirty players under Sidney Beer. The Times review (4 March) noted that the concerto was "the least satisfactory part of the concert, because neither the young violinist nor the conductor seemed to have a determined view of Brahms to present to their hearers. The solo performance was scarcely more than that of a clever student who has worked hard to memorize the concerto but is still liable to be thrown off his stroke, even to the point of forgetting his notes occasionally. The rhythm throughout was indecisive and the last pages of the Finale became almost a race between soloist and orchestra."

Illness and death
Although originally shy and introverted, Hassid was described as a carefree, likeable young man when he first came to London, but by February 1941 it became apparent that he was suffering from a severe mental disorder characterised by violent mood swings, often becoming sullen and withdrawn, and turning against his violin, his father and his religion. An inability to recognise close friends rapidly led to complete withdrawal from the world at large. He was diagnosed with schizophrenia and on June 19, withdrawn and uncooperative, he was admitted to St Andrew's Hospital in Northampton for insulin coma therapy and electroconvulsive therapy. Hassid's agent, the impresario Harold Holt, wrote to the superintendent of St Andrew's: "He is nothing short of a violinistic genius and of such exceptional quality that we want to make the greatest effort possible to cure him. I would particularly like to stress that he is most exceptional, and might have – had this illness not developed – been one of the greatest figures in the violinistic world."

His condition improved for a time and he left the hospital on 2 May 1942, but on 9 December that year he was certified insane and admitted to Moorcroft House, a private asylum in Hillingdon, Middlesex, three days later, for further treatment. On 13 July 1943 Hassid was transferred to an asylum in Epsom (Long Grove Hospital), morose, indifferent and evasive, either silent or laughing inanely. He remained there for the rest of his life. His father died in 1949, causing his condition to deteriorate to the point that on 20 October 1950 psychosurgeons subjected him to a bilateral prefrontal lobotomy.  Hassid developed a postoperative infection that progressed into meningitis, and he died on 7 November, shortly before his twenty-seventh birthday.

Recordings
Fred Gaisberg of EMI arranged for a test recording of Elgar's La Capricieuse (Op. 17) with accompanist Ivor Newton at the Abbey Road Studios on 9 January 1939 when Hassid had just turned 15; and then Walter Legge produced a further eight recordings on 12 and 28 June and 29 November 1940, this time accompanied by Gerald Moore. The delay was due to Hassid's agent Harold Holt, who thought he should continue his studies for another year. Some who heard Hassid perform live say that the records do not show him at his best. Even so, his performances of Joseph Achron's Hebrew Melody, Sarasate's Zapateado and Kreisler's Caprice viennois in particular are superb and show virtuosity of the highest order in expressive phrasing. To quote from Bryan Crimp's note with the Testament CD: "The moment Hassid puts bow to string he beguiles the ear via a captivating and uniquely individual sound ... a peerless technique and an arresting and frequently original interpretative approach. His technical security and cleanness of attack are awesome, his tone at once vibrant, virile and indescribably pure and sweet." Hassid apparently thought that his vibrato sounded too fast on record, but this is probably just a matter of taste.

Based on notes with CD issues, Feinstein 1997, newspaper advertisements and reviews, etc.

Complete published recordings issued on CD:
Pearl GEMMCD9939 (1992)
Testament SBT1010 (1992)
Symposium SYMPCD1327 (2003)
(The Testament and Symposium CDs also include the test from 1939.)

Josef Hassid was one of several prodigies whose brilliant careers were short lived. Bruno Monsaingeon's The Art of Violin commemorates Hassid.

References

The Strad magazine 94.1983/84.8; 12/1997; 5/1998, p. 455 The Strad index

External links
Hassid photo

Polish classical violinists
Male classical violinists
1923 births
1950 deaths
People from Suwałki
People from Białystok Voivodeship (1919–1939)
People with schizophrenia
Jewish classical musicians
20th-century Polish Jews
Lobotomised people
20th-century classical violinists
20th-century male musicians